Hélène Scholsen and Chanel Simmonds were the defending champions, but Simmonds chose not to participate. Scholsen partnered alongside İpek Soylu, but lost to Ágnes Bukta and Julia Terziyska in the first round.

Anna Blinkova and Yanina Wickmayer won the title, defeating Jaimee Fourlis and Kathinka von Deichmann in the final, 6–3, 4–6, [10–3].

Seeds

Draw

Draw

References
Main Draw

Wiesbaden Tennis Open - Doubles